Carlos Da Silva (born January 22, 1984) is a footballer from Portugal who currently plays as midfielder for Swiss club Rapperswil-Jona in the 1. Liga Classic.

External links
 Swiss Football League profile  
 

1984 births
Living people
Portuguese footballers
FC Lugano players
Grasshopper Club Zürich players
FC Schaffhausen players
Portuguese expatriate footballers
Portuguese expatriate sportspeople in Switzerland
Swiss Super League players
Swiss Challenge League players
Association football midfielders
Deputies of the 14th National Assembly of the French Fifth Republic
FC Rapperswil-Jona players